Hansowala, is a village in the Narowal district of Pakistan; it is located at 32°16'0N 75°10'0E and is situated at the west bank of the Ravi River.

Demographics
The total area of Hansowala is approximately 12 square kilometres. According to the 1998 census, Narowal District's population was 1,256,097 of which only 12.11% were urban It is an agricultural Village, wheat, and rice being its main crops. The literacy rate in Shakargarh is 85%.

History
Hanswowala is a village of tehsil Shakargarh ( District. Narowal Punjab, Pakistan). Before the independence of Pakistan it was the part of Tehsil Gurdas pur,  but now it is located in tehsil Shakargarh.

Notable persons
 Ehsaan ul Haq
 Qaisar Adeel Ansari (Nadaan Poet)
 Hafiz Israr ul Haq

References

Villages in Narowal District